Dzmitry Mikhailavich Dziubin (born 12 July 1990) is a Belarusian male racewalking athlete. He was the bronze medallist in the 50 kilometres race walk at the 2018 European Athletics Championships and won silver medals in that event at the European Race Walking Cup and Military World Games in 2019. He has represented Belarus twice at the World Athletics Championships (2017 and 2019) and is a five-time participant at the World Race Walking Team Championships.

He made his international debut at the age of seventeen at the 2007 World Youth Championships in Athletics, placing 17th in the 10,000 m walk. His senior debut came four years later in the 50 km walk at the 2011 European Race Walking Cup, though he failed to finish the distance. In 2013 he won national titles in the indoor 10,000 m and the 50 km outdoors. He was runner-up at the Alytus International Race Walking Festival in 2014. He finished his first international 20 km race at the 2014 IAAF World Race Walking Cup but managed only 47th.

International competitions

National titles
Belarusian Athletics Championships
50 km walk: 2013
Belarusian Indoor Athletics Championships
10,000 m walk: 2013, 2017

References

External links

1990 births
Living people
Belarusian male racewalkers
European Athletics Championships medalists
Athletes (track and field) at the 2020 Summer Olympics
Olympic athletes of Belarus